A Freemason is a member of the worldwide fraternal organization known as Freemasonry.

Freemason may also refer to:
 Freemason (horse), an Australian racehorse
 "Free Mason" (song), a song by American rapper Rick Ross from his album Teflon Don
 Freemasons (band), a Dance/House/Electronica production team from England
 "Freemason (You Broke The Promise)", a song by Boxcar on their album Vertigo